is a prefectural natural park surrounding Mount Funagata in western Miyagi Prefecture, Japan. First designated for protection in 1962, the park spans the municipalities of Kami, Sendai, Shikama, and Taiwa. Wildlife includes the Japanese serow (a special natural monument), stoat, red-flanked bluetail and forest green tree frog.

See also
 National Parks of Japan

References

External links
  Maps of Funagata Renpō Prefectural Natural Park (11, 16, 17 & 22) 

Parks and gardens in Miyagi Prefecture
Protected areas established in 1962
1962 establishments in Japan
Sendai
Kami, Miyagi
Shikama, Miyagi
Taiwa, Miyagi